The Greek film industry produced over thirty feature films in 2014. This article fully lists all non-pornographic films, including short films, that had a release date in that year and which were at least partly made by Greece. It does not include films first released in previous years that had release dates in 2014.

Major releases

See also

 2014 in film
 2014 in Greece
 Cinema of Greece
 List of Greek submissions for the Academy Award for Best Foreign Language Film

References

External links

Greek
Films
2014